Huron Plaza is a 560ft (171m) tall skyscraper in Chicago, Illinois. It was completed in 1983 and has 56 floors. Gordon and Levin designed the building, which is the 51st tallest in Chicago. It was the first residential high rise in the Near North Side's Cathedral District.

See also
List of tallest buildings in Chicago

References

Residential buildings completed in 1983
Residential skyscrapers in Chicago
Residential condominiums in Chicago
1983 establishments in Illinois